A pocketknife is a knife with one or more blades that fold into the handle. They are also known as jackknives (jack-knife), folding knives, EDC knife, or may be referred to as a penknife, though a penknife may also be a specific kind of pocketknife. Some pocketknives have multiple tools in addition to one or more blades.

Pocketknives can be used for most of the same purposes as any knife, with the advantage of folding to be carried easily with the blade not dangerously exposed.

Being safely portable, many pocketknives are suitable for use with other tools and equipment for woodcraft and bushcraft.  

Specialised designs are used for mushroom hunting and gardening. Pocketknives designed for gardening include pruning knives, which are folding knives with long curved blades used for pruning, trimming cuttings, taking buds and preparing material for grafting.

History 

The earliest known pocketknives date to at least the early Iron Age. A pocketknife with a bone handle was found at the Hallstatt Culture type site in Austria, dating to around 600–500 BCE.  Iberian folding-blade knives made by indigenous artisans and craftsmen and dating to the pre-Roman era have been found in Spain. Many folding knives from the Viking era have been found. They carried some friction binders, but more often they seem to have used folding knives that used a closure to keep the blade open.

Peasant knife

The peasant knife, farmer knife, or penny knife is the original and most basic design of a folding pocketknife, using a simple pivoted blade that folds in and out of the handle freely, without a backspring, slipjoint, or blade locking mechanism.  The first peasant knives date to the pre-Roman era, but were not widely distributed nor affordable by most people until the advent of limited production of such knives in cutlery centers such as Sheffield, England commencing around 1650, with large-scale production starting around the year 1700 with models such as Fuller's Penny Knife and the Wharncliffe Knife.  Some peasant knives used a bolster or tensioning screw at the blade to apply friction to the blade tang to keep the blade open.  The smallest (Nos. 2–5) Opinel knives are an example of the peasant knife.  The knife's low cost made it a favorite of small farmers, herdsmen, and gardeners in Europe and the Americas during the late 19th and early 20th century.

Slip joint knife 

Most pocketknives for light duty are slipjoints. This means that the blade does not lock but, once opened, is held in place by tension from a flat bar or leaf-type backspring that allows the blade to be pushed closed.  The first spring-back knives were developed around 1660 in England, but were not widely available until the Industrial Revolution and development of machinery capable of mass production. Many locking knives have only one blade, as large as can be fitted into the handle, because the locking mechanism relies on a spring-loaded latch built into the spine or frame of the handle to lock it and it is difficult to build in multiple levers, one for each blade. Slipjoints tend to be smaller than other typical pocketknives.

Some popular patterns of slipjoint knives include:

Multi-tool knives 

Multi-tool knives formerly consisted of variations on the American camper style or the Swiss Army knives manufactured by Victorinox and Wenger. However, the concept of a multitool knife has undergone a revolution thanks in part to an avalanche of new styles, sizes, and tool presentation concepts.  These new varieties often incorporate a pair of pliers and other tools in conjunction with one or more knife blade styles, either locking or nonlocking.

Multitool knives often have more than one blade, including an assortment of knife blade edges (serrated, plain, saws) as well as a selection of other tools such as bottle openers, corkscrews, and scissors. A large tool selection is the signature of the Swiss Army Knife. These knives are produced by Victorinox and Wenger and issued to military services and sold to the public.  Similar to the Swiss Army knife is the German Army knife, with two blades opening from each side and featuring hard plastic grips and aluminum liners.  The U.S. Military utility knife (MIL-K-818), issued by the United States Army, Navy, and Marine Corps, was made for many years by the Camillus Cutlery Company and Imperial Schrade as well as many other companies.  It was originally produced with carbon steel blades and brass liners (both vulnerable to corrosion), but with the onset of the Vietnam War was modified to incorporate all-stainless steel construction.  The current-issue U.S. military utility knife has textured stainless grips and four stainless blades/tools opening on both sides in the camper or scout pattern and has an extremely large clevis or bail.  The Victorinox Swiss Army Soldier Knife has been issued a National Stock Number (NSN) to be authorized for issue to US service members.  This is the first time a US military issued utility/pocket knife that was not manufactured in the United States has been adopted.

Non-slipjoint knives
Another style of folding, non-locking knife is the friction-folder. These use simple friction between the blade and scales to hold the blade in place once opened; an example is the Japanese higonokami.

The butterfly knife is a locking folding knife that does not use a spring.

An electrician's knife typically has a locking screwdriver blade but a non-locking knife blade. The two-blade Camillus Electrician's knife (the US military version is known as a TL-29) was the inspiration for the development of the linerlock.

A credit card knife is usually a very thin knife that is the shape and size of a credit card, either when folded into a knife shape or unfolded for storage. It is designed to be carried in a wallet along with regular credit cards. Some credit card knives can contain other small tools, such as tweezers or toothpicks.

A ballpoint pen knife is a pen with a concealed knife inside, typically used as a letter opener or weapon.

Lock-blade knives 

Knives with locking blades, often referred to as lock-blade knives or clasp knives, have a locking mechanism that locks the blade into its fully opened position.  This lock must be released in a distinct action before the knife can be folded.  The lock-blade knife improves safety by preventing accidental blade closure while cutting.  It is this locking blade feature that differentiates the lock-blade knife from either the peasant knife or the slipjoint spring-back knife. Locking knives also tend to be larger: it is easier to fit a lock into a larger frame, and larger knives are more likely to be used for more forceful kinds of work. The cost of a locking mechanism is also proportionally less than it would be on a smaller, and generally cheaper, knife.

Lock-blade knives have been dated to the 15th century.  In Spain, one early lock-blade design was the Andalusian clasp knife popularly referred to as the navaja.  Opinel knives use a twist lock, consisting of a metal ferrule or barrel ring that is rotated to lock the blade either open or closed.  In the late 20th century lock-blade pocketknives were popularized and marketed on a wider scale. Companies such as Buck Knives, Camillus, Case, and Gerber, created a wide range of products with locks of various types. The most popular form, the lockback knife, was popularized by Buck Knives in the 1960s, so much that the eponymous term "buck knife" was used to refer to lockback knives that were not manufactured by Buck.

The lockback's blade locking mechanism is a refinement of the slipjoint design; both use a strong backspring located along the back of the knife handle.  However, the lockback design incorporates a hook or lug on the backspring, which snaps into a corresponding notch on the blade's heel when the blade is fully opened, locking the blade into position.  Closing the blade requires the user to apply pressure to the spring-loaded bar located towards the rear of the knife handle to disengage the hook from the notch and thus release the blade.

The Walker Linerlock, invented by knifemaker Michael Walker, and the framelock came to prominence in the 1980s.  In both designs the liner inside the knife is spring-loaded to engage the rear of the blade when open and thus hold it in place.  In the case of the framelock, the liner is the handle, itself. The Swiss Army knife product range has adopted dual linerlocks on their 111 mm models. Some models feature additional "positive" locks, which essentially ensure that the blade cannot close accidentally. CRKT has patented an "Auto-LAWKS" device, which features a second sliding switch on the hilt. It can operate as any linerlock knife if so desired, but if the user slides the second control up after opening, it places a wedge between the linerlock and the frame, preventing the lock from disengaging until the second device is disabled.

Tactical folding knife 

Buck's original lockback knife was originally marketed as a "folding hunting knife" and while it became popular with sportsmen, it saw use with military personnel as it could perform a variety of tasks.  Custom knife makers began making similar knives, in particular was knifemaker Bob Terzuola. Terzuola is credited with coining the phrase "Tactical Folder".

In the early 1990s, tactical folding knives became popular in the U.S.A. The trend began with custom knifemakers such as Bob Terzuola, Michael Walker, Allen Elishewitz, Mel Pardue, Ernest Emerson, Ken Onion, Chris Reeve, Rick Hinderer, Warren Thomas, and Warren Osbourne. These knives were most commonly built as linerlocks.

In response to the demand for these knives, production companies offered mass-produced tactical folding knives.  Companies such as Benchmade, Kershaw Knives, Buck Knives, Gerber, CRKT, Spyderco and Cold Steel collaborated with tactical knifemakers; in some cases retaining them as full-time designers.  Tactical knifemakers such as Ernest Emerson and Chris Reeve went so far as to open their own mass-production factories.

Presenting any folding knife as a weapon, rather than a utility tool, has met criticism. Many who’ve studied knife fighting point out that even the strongest locking mechanisms have some risk of failure, so a folding knife is never going to be as reliable as a fixed-blade combat knife. Lynn Thompson, martial artist and CEO of Cold Steel, noted in an article in Black Belt magazine that most tactical folding knives are too short to be of much use in a knife fight. And while his company does make and sell a tactical folder, it is not the best option during an actual fight.

The case for tactical folding knives, then, is that a less-than-ideal knife in your pocket is always more useful than an ideal knife left at home. A 10-inch fixed-blade Bowie knife, for example, may be far better for combat, but it is far less practical — and often illegal — to carry around in day-to-day life. And should there be a need to take defensive action, there’s rarely enough forewarning to plan ahead which knife to carry that day.

Other features 

Traditional folding knives are opened using nail-nicks, or slots where the user's fingernail would enter to pull the blade out of the handle. This became somewhat cumbersome and required use of two hands, so there were innovations to remedy that. The thumb-stud, a small stud on the blade that allows for one-handed opening, led the way for more innovations. One of these is the thumb hole: a Spyderco patent where the user presses the pad of the thumb against a hole and opens the blade by rotating the thumb similarly to using the thumb-stud.

Another innovation of Sal Glesser, Spyderco founder, was the clip system, which he named a "Clip-it". Clips are usually metal or plastic and similar to the clips found on pens except thicker. Clips allow the knife to be easily accessible, while keeping it lint-free and unscathed by pocket items such as coins.  Assisted opening systems have been pioneered by makers like Ken Onion with his "Speed-Safe" mechanism and Ernest Emerson's Wave system, where a hook catches the user's pocket upon removal and the blade is opened during a draw.

One of the first one handed devices was the automatic spring release, also known as a switchblade. An innovation to pocketknives made possible by the thumb-stud is the replaceable blade insert developed in 1999 by Steven Overholt (U.S. Patent no. 6,574,868), originally marketed by TigerSharp Technologies and as of 2007 by Clauss. Some systems are somewhat between assisted opening and the normal thumb stud. CRKT knives designed by Harold "Kit" Carson often incorporate a "Carson Flipper", which is a small protrusion on the rear of the base of the blade such that it protrudes out the obverse side of the handle (when closed). By using an index finger and a very slight snapping of the wrist, the knife opens very quickly, appearing to operate like a spring assisted knife. When opened, the protrusion is between the base of the sharp blade and the user's index finger, preventing any accidental slipping of the hand onto the blade. Some designs feature a second "Flipper" on the opposite side of the blade, forming a small "hilt guard" such as a fixed blade knife has, which can prevent another blade from sliding up into the hilt in combat. These "flippers" are now being found on other brands of knives as well, such as Kershaw, even cheaper knives, including certain versions of Schrade's Snowblind tactical folders, and numerous others.

Legal issues 

Pocketknives are legal to own in most countries, but may face legal restrictions on their use. While pocketknives are almost always designed as tools, they do have the potential to be considered by legal authorities as weapons.

In the United States, knives are regulated by federal, state, and municipal laws. Some jurisdictions prohibit the possession or use of pocketknives that feature locking blades. Others prohibit certain blade styles perceived by law enforcement and legal authorities as optimal for offensive fighting, transforming the pocketknife from a utility tool into a deadly weapon. These might include knives with dirk, dagger (double-edge), bowie, or stiletto blades. In some jurisdictions it is illegal to conceal knives larger than a certain size or with blades over a certain length, particularly when combined with locking blade mechanisms. The possession or carrying of a folding pocketknife with a quick-opening mechanism such as a gravity knife, butterfly knife (balisong), or switchblade may be prohibited.  Under U.S. federal law, switchblades and ballistic knives are banned from interstate shipment, sale, or import, or possession on federal or Indian lands or U.S. possessions and may be prohibited entirely in some states. Knives of any size or configuration may be prohibited by federal or state laws in certain designated areas or places, such as schools, courthouses, jails, power plants, or airports.

In the United Kingdom it is illegal to carry a folding knife having a blade more than 3 inches (just over 7.6 cm) in length in public without "good reason". The terms "in public" and "good reason" are not defined, but examples of "religious duty", "national dress" and "requirement of employment or hobby" are given. It is left up to a police officer's individual subjective discretion, and ultimately a magistrate to decide if a knife is being carried "in public", and for a "good reason". However, it is illegal to have the intention of using any object in public as a weapon, meaning that even a knife that is legal to carry without needing "good reason" may still be found to be illegal if the police officer has grounds to suspect it will be used as a weapon. The onus lies on the officer to prove that intent. Recent court decisions in the U.K. have made it easier for public prosecutors to obtain knife possession convictions by preventing the accused from citing self-defence or even fear of attack as a justifiable reason for carrying a knife. The U.K. government advisory website on crime and justice formerly stated that "even if you carry a knife to protect yourself or make yourself feel safer but don’t intend to use it then you are committing a crime."

See also 

 Butterfly knife
 Higonokami
 Laguiole knife
 Multi-tool
 Navaja
 Okapi (knife)
 Switchblade

References

External links 
 

 
Camping equipment
Hunting equipment